Alexandra Rose "Alex" Windell (born 18 September 1990) is an English football midfielder who most recently played for Birmingham City F.C.

References

External links
 
 Birmingham City player profile 
 

Living people
1996 births
English women's footballers
Women's association football midfielders
Women's Super League players
Bristol Academy W.F.C. players
Birmingham City W.F.C. players